Deep Jyoti Stambh or Deepa Stambha is a unique piece of Hindu architectural
structure, usually found in Hindu temples. As the name indicates, Deep means “diya” (“oil lamp”), Jyoti means “light,” and Stambh means “a column.” Such Stambha are erected outside the temple compound, to be illuminated with diyas on special occasions.
Some famous and unique Deep Stambh in India can be seen at the Mahalsa Temple in Ponda in Goa, Shanta Durga Temple in Goa, Harsidhhi Temple at Ujjain, Tekari Temple at Dewas, Khandoba Temple at Jejuri, Mangueshi Temple at Mangeshi, Sri Yellamma Renuka temple of Saundatti, Sharana Basaveshwara Temple of Gulbarga, and Banashankari Amma Temple near Badami in Karnataka — to name a few.

References

Architecture in India
Architectural elements
Hindu temple architecture